Katlaheri is a village situated in the Karnal district of Haryana.

Karnal
Villages in Karnal district

This village is famous by the name thakur Kundan singh and Dr.panna lal sharma